The 2008 WDF Europe Cup was the 16th edition of the WDF Europe Cup darts tournament, organised by the World Darts Federation. It was held in Copenhagen, Denmark from 27–30 August.



Entered teams
23 countries/associations entered a men's selection in the event.

22 countries/associations entered a womans's selection in the event.

Men's singles

Men's pairs

Men's team
Round Robin

Group A

 97 
 95 
 90 
 95 
 90 
 96 
 92 
 93 
 92 
 93 
 94 
 93 
 93 
 93 
 95 

Group B

 97 
 96 
 90 
 93 
 91 
 97 
 96 
 93 
 97 
 95 
 95 
 98 
 93 
 93 
 93 

Group C

 93 
 93 
 97 
 96 
 91 
 92 
 97 
 95 
 90 
 95 
 92 
 91 
 94 
 91 
 93 

Group D

 97 
 95 
 97 
 94 
 97 
 93 
 90 
 93 
 98 
 98 

Knock Out

Women's singles

Women's pairs
Round Robin

Group A

 Trina Gulliver & Lisa Ashton 41  Sari Nikula & Tarja Salminen
 Trina Gulliver & Lisa Ashton 41  Janni Larsen & Mette Funch
 Trina Gulliver & Lisa Ashton 40  Zelite Putnina & Leva Brikmane-Buklovska
 Trina Gulliver & Lisa Ashton 41  Alena Pavlikova & Katerina Cepelova
 Trina Gulliver & Lisa Ashton 40  Sigridur-Gudrun Jonsdottir & Arna-Rut Gunnlaugsottir
 Sari Nikula & Tarja Salminen 41  Janni Larsen & Mette Funch
 Sari Nikula & Tarja Salminen 40  Alena Pavlikova & Katerina Cepelova
 Sari Nikula & Tarja Salminen 40  Sigridur-Gudrun Jonsdottir & Arna-Rut Gunnlaugsottir
 Janni Larsen & Mette Funch 41  Zelite Putnina & Leva Brikmane-Buklovska
 Janni Larsen & Mette Funch 42  Alena Pavlikova & Katerina Cepelova
 Janni Larsen & Mette Funch 40  Sigridur-Gudrun Jonsdottir & Arna-Rut Gunnlaugsottir
 Zelite Putnina & Leva Brikmane-Buklovska 41  Sari Nikula & Tarja Salminen
 Zelite Putnina & Leva Brikmane-Buklovska 41  Alena Pavlikova & Katerina Cepelova
 Zelite Putnina & Leva Brikmane-Buklovska 40  Sigridur-Gudrun Jonsdottir & Arna-Rut Gunnlaugsottir
 Alena Pavlikova & Katerina Cepelova 40  Sigridur-Gudrun Jonsdottir & Arna-Rut Gunnlaugsottir

Group B

 Karina Nagapetynts & Irina Armstrong 41  Carla Molema & Sharon Prins
 Karina Nagapetynts & Irina Armstrong 42  Denise Cassidy & Grace Crane
 Karina Nagapetynts & Irina Armstrong 41  Duygu Karaca & Meltem Giray
 Karina Nagapetynts & Irina Armstrong 40  Paula Smith & Angela Costa-Garcia
 Carla Molema & Sharon Prins 41  Denise Cassidy & Grace Crane
 Carla Molema & Sharon Prins 40  Duygu Karaca & Meltem Giray
 Carla Molema & Sharon Prins 40  Paula Smith & Angela Costa-Garcia
 Denise Cassidy & Grace Crane 41  Duygu Karaca & Meltem Giray
 Denise Cassidy & Grace Crane 40  Paula Smith & Angela Costa-Garcia
 Duygu Karaca & Meltem Giray 41  Paula Smith & Angela Costa-Garcia

Group C

 Susanna Young & Louise Hepburn 42  Zsuzsanna Szarka & Nora Fekete
 Susanna Young & Louise Hepburn 41  Bianka Strauch & Monique Leßmeister
 Susanna Young & Louise Hepburn 41  Hege Løkken & Tone Eriksen-Wagner
 Zsuzsanna Szarka & Nora Fekete 40  Bianka Strauch & Monique Leßmeister
 Zsuzsanna Szarka & Nora Fekete 41  Veleda Gaiga & Giada Ciofi
 Bianka Strauch & Monique Leßmeister 41  Hege Løkken & Tone Eriksen-Wagner
 Bianka Strauch & Monique Leßmeister 41  Veleda Gaiga & Giada Ciofi
 Hege Løkken & Tone Eriksen-Wagner 43  Zsuzsanna Szarka & Nora Fekete
 Hege Løkken & Tone Eriksen-Wagner 41  Veleda Gaiga & Giada Ciofi
 Veleda Gaiga & Giada Ciofi 43  Susanna Young & Louise Hepburn

Group D

 Jan Robbins & Julie Gore 43  Carina Ekberg & Gretel Glasö
 Jan Robbins & Julie Gore 43  Angela De Ward & Nicole O'Donovan
 Jan Robbins & Julie Gore 41  Rose-Marie Bussard & Denise Kochli
 Jan Robbins & Julie Gore 41  Barbara Kuntner & Claudia Rottmann
 Jan Robbins & Julie Gore 42  Ann Goossens & Nicole Delie
 Carina Ekberg & Gretel Glasö 43  Angela De Ward & Nicole O'Donovan
 Carina Ekberg & Gretel Glasö 40  Rose-Marie Bussard & Denise Kochli
 Carina Ekberg & Gretel Glasö 42  Barbara Kuntner & Claudia Rottmann
 Carina Ekberg & Gretel Glasö 41  Ann Goossens & Nicole Delie
 Angela De Ward & Nicole O'Donovan 41  Rose-Marie Bussard & Denise Kochli
 Angela De Ward & Nicole O'Donovan 40  Barbara Kuntner & Claudia Rottmann
 Angela De Ward & Nicole O'Donovan 41  Ann Goossens & Nicole Delie
 Rose-Marie Bussard & Denise Kochli 40  Barbara Kuntner & Claudia Rottmann
 Barbara Kuntner & Claudia Rottmann 40  Ann Goossens & Nicole Delie
 Ann Goossens & Nicole Delie 43  Rose-Marie Bussard & Denise Kochli

Knock Out

References

Darts tournaments